Apollo Arena Bratislava, also known as the Danube Arena, was a proposed a multi-use indoor arena in Bratislava, Slovakia. It was to be used mostly for ice hockey and basketball matches, as well as concerts and similar events. The 2011 IIHF World Championship was to be held in this arena, but later it was decided to renovate the old Ondrej Nepela Arena rather than to build a new stadium, as the city did not possess land in the proposed area between Apollo Bridge and Harbour Bridge on the right bank of Danube river. The arena was supposed to have a capacity of 13,600 people. It was named after the former Apollo refinery, destroyed by carpet bombing by the Allies in the Second World War, which was lying nearby on the left bank of Danube.

External links 
  

Indoor ice hockey venues in Slovakia
Proposed indoor arenas
Buildings and structures in Bratislava
Sport in Bratislava
Proposed buildings and structures in Slovakia